Michael Frede (31 May 1940 – 11 August 2007) was a prominent scholar of ancient philosophy, described by The Telegraph as "one of the most important and adventurous scholars of ancient philosophy of recent times."

Education and career 
Frede earned his Ph.D. at the University of Göttingen in 1966 and worked there as an Assistant from 1966 to 1971.

He joined the faculty of the Philosophy Department at University of California, Berkeley as an Assistant Professor (1971) and quickly rose to the status of full professor. From 1976 to 1991, he was a professor at the Princeton University Philosophy Department.

He returned to Europe in 1991 and took the Chair in the History of Philosophy at the University of Oxford. In 1997-8 he returned to Berkeley to lecture on free will as the 84th visiting Sather Professor of Classical Literature; the resulting book was published posthumously. He retired from Oxford in 2005 and lived in Athens, Greece until his death in a drowning accident in 2007.

He was a Member of the Göttingen Academy of Sciences and a Fellow of both the British Academy (elected 1994) and the American Academy of Arts and Sciences.

Selected works 
Pradikation und Existenzaussage: Platons Gebrauch von "...ist..." und "...ist nicht..." im Sophistes, 1967
Die Stoische Logik, 1974
Galen. Three Treatises on the Nature of Science (co-edited with Richard Walzer), 1985
Essays in Ancient Philosophy, 1987
Aristoteles 'Metaphysik Z': Text, Übersetzung und Kommentar, 2 vols (with Günther Patzig), 1988
The Original Sceptics: A Controversy (co-edited with Myles Burnyeat), 1997
Rationality in Greek Thought (co-edited with Gisela Striker), 1999
Pagan Monotheism in Late Antiquity (co-edited with Polymnia Athanassiadi), 2001
Aristotle's Metaphysics Book Lambda (co-edited with David Charles), 2001
A Free Will: origins of the notion in ancient thought (edited by A. A. Long with a foreword by David Sedley), 2011
The Pseudo-Platonic Seventh Letter (Uehiro Series in Practical Ethics), (co-author with Myles Burnyeat) Oxford University Press 2015

References

External links 
 Obituary in Prolegomena, April 2008
 A full bibliography of Michael Frede's works (1962–2011)

Princeton University faculty
Academics of the University of Oxford
University of California, Berkeley College of Letters and Science faculty
1940 births
2007 deaths
University of Göttingen alumni
German scholars of ancient Greek philosophy
German male writers
20th-century German philosophers